In Māori tradition, Te Wakatūwhenua was one of the great ocean-going, voyaging canoes that were used in the migrations that settled New Zealand. Te Wakatūwhenua is said to have landed at Cape Rodney (just north of Leigh), its crew suffering a mysterious illness.

See also
List of Māori waka

References

Māori waka
Māori mythology